Night of the Moonjellies is a children's picture book written and illustrated by Mark Shasha. This book was published by Simon & Schuster in the year 1992

About The Book
The book was inspired by the author's memories of working at his grandmother's hot dog stand by the sea in New London, Connecticut in the 1970s. It features the warm relationship between the main character, a boy of 7 years old, and his grandmother, along with the hustle and bustle of the busy day at the hot dog stand.  

Night of the Moonjellies also features a small, jelly-like creature found in the North Atlantic called a moonjelly. Also commonly known as a comb jelly this animal is capable of bioluminescence. Its scientific name is ctenophore (pronounced 'tee-ne-for').

Awards
The book won a Marion Vannett Ridgway Award, is featured in many educational programs and has been reprinted in several editions. 
In its review Smithsonian Magazine said it "was sure to become a classic."1 
Mark Shasha's artwork from "Night of the Moonjellies" has been exhibited in several museums and galleries since 1992.

Adaptations
Singer/songwriter Steve Elci has expressed interest in creating the score should the book ever be made into a film.2

References
"Something About the Author", volume 83, Mark Shasha, pp. 202–203. Gale Pub.1993
"Five in a Row" Book List, Volume 1 
Moonjellies Educational Projects at "Spell it Out Loud"  
Moonjellies reprints 
1Smithsonian Magazine, 1992, Nov. p. 42
2 Steve Elci Dreams of Moonjellies, "The New London Day", Grace Section, May 15,2014 
Salem News, "The Pages of Children's Books Fill Marblehead Museum", by Matthew K. Roy, Feb. 2, 2006
"Shasha's work evokes the pre-Raphaelites...windows into a world full of detail" - The New York Times, Vivien Raynor, "Dancing Fairies, Cavorting Pigs: Illustrations for Children’s Books" August 8, 1993, p. 16
Lyman Allyn Museum of Art, Exhibition directory, New London, CT. 1992
The Maritime Museum – “Moonjellies and Daydreams - The Art of Mark Shasha” - New London, CT - July-August-Sept 2012
 Publishers Weekly, Jun 6, 1996, p. 64

External links

Mark Shasha's Website
The Marion Vannett Ridgway Awards

American picture books
1992 children's books
Simon & Schuster books